Cosmopterix catharacma is a moth in the family Cosmopterigidae. It was described by Edward Meyrick in 1909. It is found in Sri Lanka.

References

Moths described in 1909
catharacma